Good Girl Gone Bad is a 2007 album by Rihanna, and its title track.
Good Girl Gone Bad: Reloaded, the album's reissue
Good Girl Gone Bad: The Remixes, a remix album by Rihanna.

Good Girl Gone Bad may also refer to:
 Good Girl Gone Bad, a 1995 album by Mia X
 "Good Girl Gone Bad", a 2002 song by the Herbaliser from Something Wicked This Way Comes
 "Good Girl Gone Bad", a 1987 song by Kiss from Crazy Nights
 "Good Girl Gone Bad", a 1989 song by Stephanie Mills from Home